Rollet may refer to:

People
 Joseph Rollet, French venereologist
 Louis Rollet, French painter
 Maurice Rollet, French activist
 Paul-Frédéric Rollet, French general

Places
 Rollet, former municipality now in Rouyn-Noranda, Canada
 Rollet Island, Antarctica